Chichester is a constituency in West Sussex, represented in the House of Commons of the UK Parliament since 2017 by Gillian Keegan, a Conservative.

History
Chichester centres on the small medieval cathedral city by the South Downs National Park.  It is one of the oldest constituencies in the UK, having been created when commoners were first called to the Model Parliament in 1295 as one of the original Parliamentary boroughs returning two members. The seat has sent one member since 1868, after the Reform Act 1867.
 
In its various forms, Chichester has been a Conservative stronghold since 1868, and has been held by them continuously since 1924.

Boundaries

1885–1918: The Municipal Borough of Chichester, the Sessional Divisions of Arundel and Chichester, and part of the Sessional Division of Steyning.

1918–1950: The Municipal Boroughs of Arundel and Chichester, the Urban Districts of Bognor and Littlehampton, and the Rural Districts of East Preston, Midhurst, Petworth, Westbourne, and Westhampnett.

1950–1974: The Municipal Borough of Chichester, the Urban District of Bognor Regis, and the Rural District of Chichester.

1974–1983: The Municipal Borough of Chichester, the Rural Districts of Midhurst and Petworth, and part of the Rural District of Chichester.

1983–1997: The District of Chichester. The constituency boundaries remained unchanged.

1997–2010: All the wards of the District of Chichester except the Bury, Plaistow and Wisborough Green wards.

2010–present: The District of Chichester wards of Bosham, Boxgrove, Chichester East, Chichester North, Chichester South, Chichester West, Donnington, Easebourne, East Wittering, Fernhurst, Fishbourne, Funtington, Harting, Lavant, Midhurst, North Mundham, Plaistow, Rogate, Selsey North, Selsey South, Sidlesham, Southbourne, Stedham, Tangmere, West Wittering, and Westbourne.

The seat forms a far western strip of West Sussex and covers most of the Chichester district.

Before the 1974 redistribution Chichester was a more compact seat, taking in the eastern towns of Arundel and Bognor Regis in latter years.  Emergence of newer urban centres and modern cities meant that the area was expanded to the north to avoid malapportionment.

Constituency profile

Physical geography
The constituency runs from the county's border with Surrey, through a partly wooded broad swathe of the South Downs, to the town of Selsey and paired villages The Witterings on the English Channel. The small cathedral city Chichester and Selsey account for 6 of 24 wards but comprise a higher proportion of councillors as these are larger three-member wards. Another larger Ward comprises the Georgian market town of Midhurst towards the north. The highest density of villages is near the Hampshire border, in the west.

Social geography
The city has relatively little social housing and few homes which are cheap to buy or rent, as epitomised in the National Park status of much of the land north of Chichester.  In Chichester itself the percentage of social housing in 2011 was 20.5%, including 3% directly in local authority homes.  The area is linked to London by train and the A3. Modestly deprived areas of Chichester, Selsey and the rural South Downs are dominated by the working poor and poorer pensioners with little generational unemployment. The local economy has many entry-level or intensive manual jobs in food production, retail, driving, warehousing as well as intermittent or traditionally low paid labour such as road repair and the care sector. Some of these workers commute from the outskirts of nearest major cities Brighton and Portsmouth. The contributory districts occupy the top two rankings out of all seven in terms of fuel poverty in West Sussex.

Results
The seat has been Conservative since 1924; in 2017 incumbent Keegan saw her vote share exceed that of 1992.  The closest election since then was the 1997 general election, where a Liberal Democrat took 29% of the vote.  The best performances by a Labour candidates were in 2001 and 2017, with 21.4% and 22.4% of the vote, respectively.  In terms of the fourth party since 2001, the three general elections to 2010 saw an increase in support for the UK Independence Party to their highest level to date, 6.8%.

Members of Parliament

MPs 1295–1660

 Constituency created 1295

MPs 1660–1868

MPs since 1868

Elections

Elections in the 2010s

Elections in the 2000s

Elections in the 1990s

This constituency underwent boundary changes between the 1992 and 1997 general elections and thus change in share of vote is based on a notional calculation.

Elections in the 1980s

Elections in the 1970s

Elections in the 1960s

Elections in the 1950s

Elections in the 1940s 

General Election 1939–40:

Another general election was required to take place before the end of 1940. The political parties had been making preparations for an election to take place from 1939 and by the end of this year, the following candidates had been selected; 
Conservative: John Courtauld
Labour: E A Weston
Liberal: Gerald Kidd
British Union: Charles Hudson

Elections in the 1930s

Elections in the 1920s

Elections in the 1910s 

General Election 1914–15:

Another General Election was required to take place before the end of 1915. The political parties had been making preparations for an election to take place and by July 1914, the following candidates had been selected; 
Unionist: Edmund Talbot
Liberal:

Elections in the 1900s

Elections in the 1890s

Elections in the 1880s

 Caused by Gordon-Lennox's resignation.

Elections in the 1870s

 Caused by Lennox's appointment as First Commissioner of Works and Public Buildings

Elections in the 1860s

 Seat reduced to one member 

 Caused by Freeland's resignation.

Elections in the 1850s

 

 Caused by Gordon-Lennox's appointment as a Lord Commissioner of the Treasury.

 Caused by Gordon-Lennox's appointment as a Lord Commissioner of the Treasury.

Elections in the 1840s

 Caused by Lennox's resignation by accepting the office of Steward of the Manor of Hempholme

 Caused by Lennox's appointment as Clerk of the Ordnance

 Caused by Lennox's appointment as a Lord Commissioner of the Treasury

Elections in the 1830s

See also
List of parliamentary constituencies in West Sussex

Notes

References

Sources
Election result, 2010 (BBC)
Election result, 2005 (BBC)
Election results, 1997 – 2001 (BBC)
Election results, 1997 – 2001  (Election Demon)
Election results, 1983 – 1992 (Election Demon)
Election results, 1992 – 2010 (Guardian) (UKIP result for 2001 is incorrect)

External links 
nomis Constituency Profile for Chichester — presenting data from the ONS annual population survey and other official statistics.

Parliamentary constituencies in South East England
Constituencies of the Parliament of the United Kingdom established in 1295
Politics of Chichester